W23BW-D (channel 23) is a low-power Class A television station in Madison, Wisconsin, United States.

History
W54BH, known as "WSSM-TV", began broadcasting in March 1989. It was owned by Chicago TV weatherman Dan Dobrowolski, who had previously been the general manager of another Madison LPTV, W05BD; that station left the owner when owner Warren Cave resisted an attempt by Dobrowolski to take over and carted away his equipment. WSSM assumed the sports- and movie-heavy schedule that W05BD had broadcast. WSSM leased a cable channel on the local system, but when it changed formats in November 1989 to The Jukebox Network, an all-request music video channel, the cable system removed it from its lineup. After the switch, the station closed its Madison offices and became little more than a laserdisc player and a transmitter on the roof of the Concourse Hotel. It also failed in its attempts to be reinstated on cable.

In March 1994, after being sold to the Three Angels Broadcasting Network (3ABN), the low-power station began airing its Seventh-day Adventist programming. W54BH was moved to channel 23 in 2001 to accommodate the pre-transition digital signal of WREX in Rockford, Illinois. The station continued to broadcast 3ABN and, when the station flash cut to digital in 2014, several of its audio channels. 

In 2017, W23BW was sold to HC2 Holdings as part of a 14-station, $9.6 million sale of Three Angels-owned LPTV stations.  The deal made W23BW the second LPTV station in Madison owned by HC2, which also operates WZCK-LD through its DTV America subsidiary. On October 30, 2020, HC2 would make changes to W23BW's subchannel lineup. 3ABN would remain in the lineup per terms of the purchase agreement between HC2 and Three Angels but would relocate to subchannel 23.5. The main channel, 23.1, would see the addition of HC2-owned Azteca América, giving W23BW the distinction of being Madison's first full-time Spanish-language television station, as well as the 2nd full-time Spanish broadcast outlet in the market (after WLMV radio). Spanish language programming was augmented in September 2021 via the addition of the telenovela focused Novelisima network added to 23.6.  Content from the infomercial and classic TV service Timeless TV would replace Azteca América on January 1, 2023 after that network ceased operations. Novelisima would also be replaced with NBC Lx, ending Spanish-language programming on the channel.

Subchannels
The station's digital signal is multiplexed:

References

External links
 FCC public inspection file for W23BW-D

23BW-D
Television channels and stations established in 1989
1989 establishments in Wisconsin
Low-power television stations in the United States
Innovate Corp.